The 146th Regiment Illinois Volunteer Infantry was an infantry regiment that served in the Union Army during the American Civil War.

Service
The 146th Illinois Infantry was organized at Camp Butler, Illinois, and mustered into Federal service on September 18, 1864, for a one-year enlistment.  The 146th served in garrisons in Illinois.

The regiment was mustered out of service on July 5, 1865.

Total strength and casualties
The regiment suffered 38 enlisted men who died of disease for a total of 38 fatalities.

Commanders
Colonel Henry H. Dean - mustered out with the regiment.

See also
List of Illinois Civil War Units
Illinois in the American Civil War

Notes

References
The Civil War Archive

Units and formations of the Union Army from Illinois
Military units and formations established in 1864
1864 establishments in Illinois
Military units and formations disestablished in 1865